Carlos Pacheco (born 8 June 1957) is a Brazilian judoka. He competed in the men's half-heavyweight event at the 1976 Summer Olympics.

References

External links
 

1957 births
Living people
Brazilian male judoka
Olympic judoka of Brazil
Judoka at the 1976 Summer Olympics
Sportspeople from São Paulo
Pan American Games medalists in judo
Pan American Games gold medalists for Brazil
Judoka at the 1979 Pan American Games
Medalists at the 1979 Pan American Games
20th-century Brazilian people
21st-century Brazilian people